Timber the Treasure Dog is a 2016 American family film directed by Ari Novak and starring Wilford Brimley and featuring the voice of Kix Brooks as the titular character.  The film was released to DVD and streaming platforms on January 5, 2016.

Cast
Wilford Brimley as Hawk Jones
J.D. Hoppe as Mikey Jones
Averie South as Billie Fanning
Sage Chase as Claire Jones
Rib Hillis as Emmet Jones
Sewell Whitney as Casper Stonewall
Jessica Morris as Jamie Fanning

Voice cast
Kix Brooks as Timber
Vernon Wells as Wolf 
Kelcey Watson as BBQ 
Keith Anderson as Thunder
Sonya Rose Atkinson as Witch
Nick Campagna as Moo the Cow
Bob Canush as Lama
Casey Fitzgerald as Kaia
John Freeman as Horse
Duane Gulick as Duane the Horse
Nikki C. Moler as Kitten
Ari Novak as Sid the Pig
Marcelo Palacios as Manny the Pig
Riddick Sanchez as Party Dog
Elizabeth Schmiesing as Chicken

Production
Principal photography took place in Paradise Valley during the summer and autumn of 2014.

Reception
Barbara Shulgasser-Parker of Common Sense Media awarded the film three stars out of five, saying "This movie caters to children's dream of overcoming obstacles and acting heroically, especially when their risky behavior turns out to help their parents resolve real-world problems."

References

External links
 
 

2016 films
Films shot in Montana
2010s English-language films
American action adventure films
2010s American films